Balša Božović (born on May 1, 1987 in Podgorica) is a retired Montenegrin footballer who played as midfielder. He played for Persela Lamongan, Melaka United and Arema FC.

Honours

Club
FK Mogren
 Montenegrin First League: 2008–09
 Montenegrin Cup: 2007–08

References

1987 births
Living people
Footballers from Podgorica
Association football midfielders
Serbia and Montenegro footballers
Montenegrin footballers
FK Budućnost Podgorica players
FK Mogren players
FK Zeta players
OFK Titograd players
FK Čelik Nikšić players
FK Mornar players
Persela Lamongan players
OFK Petrovac players
Melaka United F.C. players
FK Iskra Danilovgrad players
Arema F.C. players
First League of Serbia and Montenegro players
Montenegrin First League players
Liga 1 (Indonesia) players
Montenegrin expatriate footballers
Expatriate footballers in Indonesia
Montenegrin expatriate sportspeople in Indonesia